Oligodon barroni is a species of snake in the family Colubridae. The species is endemic to Southeast Asia.

Etymology
The specific name, barroni, is in honor of Mr. P.A.R. Barron who collected the first three specimens including the holotype.

Geographic range
O. barroni is found in Cambodia, Laos, Thailand, and Vietnam.

Habitat

Description
The dorsal scales are arranged in 17 rows at midbody.

Diet
O. barroni feeds predominantly on eggs of small skinks and of other reptiles.

Reproduction
O. barroni is oviparous.

References

Further reading
Chan-ard T, Nabhitabhata J, Parr JWK (2015). A Field Guide to the Reptiles of Thailand. New York: Oxford University Press. 352 pp. .
Smith MA (1916). "Descriptions of Three New Lizards and a New Snake from Siam". Journal of the Natural History Society of Siam 2 (1): 44–47. (Simotes barroni, new species, pp. 46–47).
Smith MA (1943). The Fauna of British India, Ceylon and Burma, Including the Whole of the Indo-Chinese Sub-region. Reptilia and Amphibia. Vol. III.—Serpentes. London: Secretary of State for India. (Taylor and Francis, printers). xii + 583 pp. (Oligodon barroni, new combination, pp. 210–211, Figure 68).

barroni
Snakes of Asia
Snakes of Vietnam
Reptiles of Cambodia
Reptiles of Laos
Reptiles of Thailand
Reptiles of Vietnam
Taxa named by Malcolm Arthur Smith
Reptiles described in 1885